The Salvadoran Stock Exchange (BVES) is the stock exchange in the nation of El Salvador. The exchange is used for the securitization of various government infrastructure projects. The exchange was established in 1992. It is overseen by Central Securities Depository (CEDEVAL).

The market grew from handling U.S. $600 million  initially to more than U.S. $3 billion by 2006 and almost $6 billion by the end of 2011. Rolando Duarte was chief of the BVES as of 2013. , there were 34 companies trading on the exchange, the vast majority in finance or insurance businesses.

References

Economy of El Salvador
Financial services companies established in 1992
Stock exchanges in North America
1992 establishments in El Salvador